Vernon was launched at Bordeaux in 1775, almost certainly under another name. She first appeared in British records in 1779. Between 1781 and 1782, she was an armed transport and in 1781 took part in an action that cost her 13 crew members killed and wounded. After the war she traded widely. In 1787 she carried emigrants to Sierra Leone for the Committee for the Relief of the Black Poor. She was wrecked in December 1792.

Career
Vernon first appeared in Lloyd's Register (LR) in 1779.

Between 1781 and 1782, Vernon served as an hired armed storeship.

On 10 September 1781, Captain Hall, of the transport Vernon was at Cork, from where he wrote a letter detailing with a report of the action of 21 July 1781 in which she had been involved. Vernon exchanged broadsides with the frigates, the broadsides causing casualties on Vernon and much damage. The action continued for three glasses and 20 minutes before the French frigates withdrew. British casualties included Captain Evans an eight people killed and 14 wounded on Charles-town. Vernon suffered six killed and seven wounded. Vulture had had one man killed and three wounded. The merchant vessels and their cargoes of coal had entered Spanish River safely before the action had started. Charlestown and the escorts, including Vernon, sailed back to Halifax.

In the action of 16 March 1782,  fought, captured, and burned the 34-gun Spanish frigate Santa Catalina off Cape Spartel. Success was escorting the storeship Vernon to Gibraltar. At the time, Vernon was under the command of Mr. John Falconer. She left her escort escort the day the engagement started and continued on to Gibraltar.

Vernon, Shaw, master, safely rode out a hurricane on 30 July 1784 at Jamaica.

On 2 January 1785 as Vernon, Shaw, master, was on her way toEngland she encountered a gale that caused minor damage.

On 11 January 1787, Atlantic, Muirhead, master, and Belisarius, Sill, master sailed from Gravesend, bound for Sierra Leone. Vernon delayed leaving London to take on some more migrants, but then sailed to join the other two vessels and their escort at Portsmouth.

Bad weather forced them to divert to Plymouth, during which time about 50 passengers died. Another 24 were discharged, and 23 ran away. Eventually, with some more recruitment, 411 passengers sailed to Sierra Leone in April 1787. 

Atlantic, Bellisarius, and Vernon, Gill, master, sailed from Portsmouth on 23 February under escort by the sloop-of-war HMS Nautilous.

The four vessels were reported to have been safe at Tenerife on 24 April and had been expected to sail to Sierra Leone that night. Ninety-six passengers died on the voyage from Portsmouth to Sierra Leone.

Fate
In December Vernon, Barriman, master, was driven ashore east of Ostend and it was feared that she would be lost. She was on a voyage from Dunkerque to Tobago. NLL281292

Vernon was last listed in 1793 with data unchanged since 1792.

Citations

References
 
 

1775 ships
Ships built in France
Age of Sail merchant ships of England
Hired armed vessels of the Royal Navy
Maritime incidents in 1792